Mike James or Michael James may refer to:

 Mickie James (born 1979), American professional wrestler
 Mike James (American football) (born 1991), American football running back
 Michael James, American musician with Explosions in the Sky
 Michael James (Australian footballer) (born 1971), Australian rules footballer 
 Mike James (baseball) (born 1967), American baseball player
 Mike James (basketball, born 1975), American basketball player
 Mike James (basketball, born 1990), American basketball player
 Michael James (cricketer, born 1934), English cricketer
 Michael James (cricketer, born 1987), English cricketer
 Michael James (politician) (1861–1943), Canadian politician of the early 20th century
 Michael James (producer) (born 1962), American record producer, guitarist, and mixing engineer
 Michael James (quilt artist) (born 1949), American artist
 Mike James (rugby union) (born 1973), Canadian rugby union player
 Michael James (singer), British singer and songwriter
 Michael N. G. James (born 1940), professor of biochemistry at the University of Alberta

See also

James Michael (disambiguation)